Edward Ritchie White (born 13 April 1935) is a Scottish former professional footballer who played as a forward. White is the older brother of John White and Tom White both professional footballers.

Career
Born in Musselburgh, White played for Musselburgh Athletic, Falkirk, Bradford City, Arbroath and Alloa Athletic.

References

1935 births
Living people
Scottish footballers
Musselburgh Athletic F.C. players
Falkirk F.C. players
Bradford City A.F.C. players
Arbroath F.C. players
Alloa Athletic F.C. players
Scottish Football League players
English Football League players
Sportspeople from Musselburgh
Association football forwards
Scottish Junior Football Association players
Footballers from East Lothian